The 1955 Twickenham by-election was a parliamentary by-election held on 25 January 1955 for the British House of Commons constituency of Twickenham in Middlesex.

The seat had become vacant when the constituency's Conservative Member of Parliament (MP), Sir Edward Keeling, had died on 23 November 1954.  He had held the seat since the 1935 general election.

The result was a comfortable victory for the Conservative candidate Gresham Cooke, a director of the Society of Motor Manufacturers and Traders. He held the seat until his death shortly before the 1970 general election.

Results

See also 
 Twickenham constituency
 Twickenham
 1929 Twickenham by-election
 1932 Twickenham by-election
 1934 Twickenham by-election
 Lists of United Kingdom by-elections

References 

 British Parliamentary by-elections, 1955
 Richard Kimber's political science resources: UK General Election results October 1951
 

Elections in the London Borough of Richmond upon Thames
1955 in London
1955 elections in the United Kingdom
By-elections to the Parliament of the United Kingdom in London constituencies
Twickenham
20th century in Middlesex
January 1955 events in the United Kingdom